Ematheudes is a genus of snout moths. It was described by Philipp Christoph Zeller in 1867 and is known from Zimbabwe, South Africa, the Democratic Republic of the Congo, Zambia, Namibia, Kenya, Sierra Leone, Seychelles, Iran, Ethiopia, Syria, Hungary, Italy, Angola, Togo and Tunisia.

Species
 Ematheudes convexus J. C. Shaffer, 1998
 Ematheudes crassinotella Ragonot, 1888
 Ematheudes crenulatus J. C. Shaffer, 1998
 Ematheudes dewittei J. C. Shaffer, 1998
 Ematheudes elysium J. C. Shaffer, 1998
 Ematheudes erectus J. C. Shaffer, 1998
 Ematheudes forficatus J. C. Shaffer, 1998
 Ematheudes hamatus J. C. Shaffer, 1998
 Ematheudes hispidus J. C. Shaffer, 1998
 Ematheudes kenyaensis J. C. Shaffer, 1998
 Ematheudes lusingensis J. C. Shaffer, 1998
 Ematheudes maculescens J. C. Shaffer, 1998
 Ematheudes megacantha J. C. Shaffer, 1998
 Ematheudes michaelshafferi J. C. Shaffer, 1998
 Ematheudes miosticta (Hampson, 1918)
 Ematheudes natalensis J. C. Shaffer, 1998
 Ematheudes neonepsia J. C. Shaffer, 1998
 Ematheudes neurias (Hampson, 1918)
 Ematheudes nigropunctata (Legrand, 1966)
 Ematheudes paleatella Ragonot, 1888
 Ematheudes persicella (Amsel, 1961)
 Ematheudes pollex J. C. Shaffer, 1998
 Ematheudes pseudopunctella Ragonot, 1888
 Ematheudes punctella (Treitschke, 1833)
 Ematheudes quintuplex J. C. Shaffer, 1998
 Ematheudes rhizolineata (Bradley, 1980)
 Ematheudes rhodochroa (Hampson, 1918)
 Ematheudes setigera J. C. Shaffer, 1998
 Ematheudes sinuosus J. C. Shaffer, 1998
 Ematheudes straminella Snellen, 1872
 Ematheudes strictus J. C. Shaffer, 1998
 Ematheudes togoensis J. C. Shaffer, 1998
 Ematheudes toxalis J. C. Shaffer, 1998
 Ematheudes triangularus J. C. Shaffer, 1998
 Ematheudes trimaculosus J. C. Shaffer, 1998
 Ematheudes tunesiella Ragonot in Staudinger, 1892
 Ematheudes varicella Ragonot, 1887
 Ematheudes vitellinella Ragonot, 1887

References

Anerastiini
Pyralidae genera